21 Air, LLC is an all-cargo airline of the United States with headquarters at Greensboro, North Carolina. The airline operates a fleet of Boeing 767 aircraft. Its main base is the Piedmont Triad International Airport.

History
21 Air was founded in February 25, 2014 as a virtual airline operating under Dynamic Airways' air operator's certificate.

Destinations
21 Air operates scheduled cargo services between the United States and Mexico.

Fleet

Current fleet

As of December 2022, the 21 Air fleet consists of the following aircraft:

21 Air also operates an Airbus A330-200 as an auxiliary freighter in sub-service basis.

Former fleet
The fleet of 21 Air also consisted of the following aircraft:

1 Boeing 747-400BCF

See also
 List of airlines of the United States

References

External links

21 Air official website
Airlines of the United States
Airlines established in 2014